Irakleia is a former municipality in the Arta regional unit, Epirus, Greece. Since the 2011 local government reform it is part of the municipality Georgios Karaiskakis, of which it is a municipal unit. The municipal unit has an area of 129.887 km2. It had a population of 1,239 in 2011. The seat of the municipality was in Ano Kalentini.

References

Populated places in Arta (regional unit)